Kyla Cole (born Martina Jacová, ; November 10, 1978) is a Slovak glamour model, Penthouse Pet and former television presenter.

Early life 
Kyla Cole was born in Prešov, Czechoslovakia (present Slovakia), and was her parents' first-born child.

Career 
Cole began her career in 1999, after winning the "Ms. Monticello Raceway Pageant", while working as a counselor at the Camp Na-Sho-Pa summer camp Bloomingburg, in upstate New York.

She has also been a part owner of a modeling agency.

Modeling 
Cole was named Penthouse Pet of the Month in March 2000. Within a year, she had appeared on the covers of dozens of men's magazines. She was offered the position of Penthouse Pet of the Year, but had to decline because she was unable to obtain a US work visa.

Cole also appeared as Supergirl and Wonder Woman for live-action comic book website Superheroines.net.

Television 
In May 2001 Cole was invited to participate as a surprise guest at the season finale of season 1 of Big Brother in Norway. She was invited because one of the male housemates had proclaimed Cole was his dream woman after seeing pictures of her, which had been posted on the walls in the house by the female housemates to cheer up another male housemate. 
The producers of the TV show hints of Cole's surprise appearance when they, to the male housemates despair, secretly removes the best picture of Cole, and 2 weeks before the season finale, proclaims that all will be revealed. During the season, two of the male housemates name in Cole's honor a pizza recipe after her.

In August 2003 Cole was chosen to host the weekly erotic TV show Láskanie, on the Slovak commercial TV station Markíza. 
She was replaced in April 2004.

Acting 
Cole has starred in three movies with erotic film director Andrew Blake.

Between February and April 2005 Cole was in the Philippines shooting a local action movie, playing the lead female role of Karen. The working title was "Rumble boyz", but was changed to "Rumble boy" upon release in April 2007.

Spokesmodel 
In March 2005 Cole was the spokesmodel in a campaign to promote a new instant coffee product for the Slovak company Baliarne obchodu a.s. Poprad., 
being featured on billboards all around Slovakia. 
One of the billboards, displaying a scantily clad Cole with the slogan "For your enjoyment", was later convicted of breaching the standards of decency and morality by the Council for Advertising in Slovakia.

Video game 
In November 2006 the Slovak-based computer game developer Cypron Studios announced Cole had signed an exclusive contract to be the official face of their game GODS: Land of Infinity. 
A special edition of the game was subsequently released in July 2007, featuring Cole as the lead heroine Vivien.

Personal life 
Cole claimed in interviews early in her career to be bisexual, 
but in an interview in 2010 she withdraws this, stating "To tell you the truth, I'm not bisexual. It was the marketing strategy regarding my pictures in the past."

Cole is  living in Slovakia, working as a model and taking care of her personal website.

Charity 
Between April 2004 and January 2005, Cole did charity work, caring for an orphanage in Šarišské Michaľany, Slovakia.

See also

List of Penthouse Pets

References

External links 

 
 
 
 

1978 births
Living people
Penthouse Pets
Slovak female models